Gobseck, an 1830 novella by French author Honoré de Balzac (1799-1850), appears in the Scènes de la vie privée section of his novel sequence La Comédie humaine.
Gobseck first appeared in outline form in La Mode in March 1830 under the title l'Usurier (The Usurer), and then in August 1830 in the periodical Le Voleur.  The actual novella appeared in a volume published by Mame-Delaunay under the title Les Dangers de l'inconduite.  This novella would appear in 1835 under the title of Papa Gobseck in a volume published by Madame Charles-Béchet.  The definitive title of Gobseck originated in 1842 in the Furne edition of La Comédie humaine.

Plot
The plot of Gobseck, set during the French Restoration, is framed within a conversation between lawyer Maître Derville and Vicomtesse de Grandlieu. Derville tells a story which focuses on Anastasie de Restaud, née Goriot.  Anastasie de Restaud is the daughter of a rich bourgeois who has married into the aristocracy, but is bored by her marriage, which is loveless and passionless.

Anastasie de Restaud has an affair with Maxime de Trailles, and spends her fortune on de Trailles.  She turns to the usurer Jean-Esther van Gobseck for financial assistance.  Maître Derville acts as Gobseck’s lawyer while Derville's future wife is also one of Gobseck's debtors.

Anastasie's husband finds out about her debts, so he signs a convoluted contract with Gobseck which is supposed to benefit his and Anastasie's children. However, Anastasie destroys that contract during her irrational schemings. Subsequently, both Anastasie's marriage is destroyed and her family fortune is lost.

Eventually, elderly Gobseck gains an even larger fortune through factoring. Shortly after his death, Derville discovers many treasures in Gobseck's home, including loads of spoiled food which Gobseck had intended to sell.

Film versions
Gobseck, Soviet film by Konstantin Eggert
Gobseck, Soviet remake of the 1936 film by Alexandre Orlov.
 Gobseck, Czechoslovak TV play, 1985

References

External links
 

Books of La Comédie humaine
Novels set in 19th-century France
1830 French novels
Novellas by Honoré de Balzac
French novels adapted into films